The Town of Parachute is a home rule municipality in Garfield County, Colorado, United States. The population was 1,085 at the 2010 census.

The town is the birthplace of Willard Libby, recipient of the 1960 Nobel Prize in Chemistry.

Etymology
The town's name comes from Parachute Creek which runs through the township, before it merges with the Colorado River. The Ute people originally called the creek Pahchouc (meaning twins), with early settlers mispronouncing the word as parachute.  In 1908 the town was renamed Grand Valley, but in the 1980s was changed back to Parachute.

Geography
Parachute is on the northwest side of the Colorado River where it is joined by Parachute Creek. Interstate 70 passes through the town, with access from Exit 75. I-70 leads east  to Glenwood Springs, the county seat, and southwest  to Grand Junction. Parachute is bordered to the southeast across the Colorado River by the unincorporated community of Battlement Mesa.

Climate
This climatic region is typified by large seasonal temperature differences, with warm to hot (and often humid) summers and cold (sometimes severely cold) winters.  According to the Köppen Climate Classification system, Parachute has a humid continental climate, abbreviated "Dfb" on climate maps.
<div style="width:65%">

</div style>

Demographics

As of the census of 2000, there were 1,006 people, 381 households, and 233 families residing in the town. The racial makeup of the town was 86.88% White, 0.80% African American, 1.59% Native American, 0.40% Asian, 0.70% Pacific Islander, 5.67% from other races, and 3.98% from two or more races. Hispanic or Latino of any race were 19.78% of the population.

There were 381 households, out of which 39.9% had children under the age of 18 living with them, 41.7% were married couples living together, 11.8% had a female householder with no husband present, and 38.8% were non-families. 32.8% of all households were made up of individuals, and 10.5% had someone living alone who was 65 years of age or older.  The average household size was 2.64 and the average family size was 3.42.

In the town, the population was spread out, with 34.2% under the age of 18, 9.1% from 18 to 24, 32.3% from 25 to 44, 15.4% from 45 to 64, and 8.9% who were 65 years of age or older.  The median age was 29 years. For every 100 females, there were 100.8 males.  For every 100 females age 18 and over, there were 103.7 males.

The median income for a household in the town was $31,208, and the median income for a family was $34,423. Males had a median income of $31,118 versus $21,875 for females. The per capita income for the town was $14,114.  About 7.7% of families and 12.4% of the population were below the poverty line, including 15.1% of those under age 18 and 22.5% of those age 65 or over.

Infrastructure

Transportation
Parachute is part of Bustang's West Line that connects Grand Junction to Denver.

See also

 List of municipalities in Colorado

References

External links

 Town of Parachute official website
 CDOT map of the Town of Parachute

Towns in Garfield County, Colorado
Towns in Colorado
Populated places established in 1908
1908 establishments in Colorado